Point Salubrious Historic District is a national historic district located at Lyme near Chaumont in Jefferson County, New York.  The district includes 11 contributing buildings and four contributing structures.  It includes a farmhouse, a boarding house, five seasonal bungalows, five associated outbuildings (one non-contributing), one remnant shed, and six pumphouse structures (two non-contributing).

It was listed on the National Register of Historic Places in 1990.

References

Historic districts on the National Register of Historic Places in New York (state)
Historic districts in Jefferson County, New York
National Register of Historic Places in Jefferson County, New York